Gautier Paulin (born 26 March 1990) is a French former professional motocross racer. He competed in the Motocross World Championships from 2008 until 2020. Paulin was a member of the French team that won five consecutive Motocross des Nations events between 2014 and 2018.

Biography
Born in Draguignan, France, Paulin began racing BMX bikes at the age of 6 and, won a BMX world championship at the age of 10. He won the 2007 European motocross championship in the EMX2 class. He then competed in the MX2 class of the Motocross World Championship with his best result being a third-place finish in the 2009 MX2 championship while riding for the Kawasaki Bud Racing PSM Racing team. Paulin was then contracted to ride in the premier MXGP class for the Honda factory racing team. He finished the 2015 FIM Motocross World Championship as runner up to Romain Febvre. He raced for Rockstar Energy Husqvarna Factory Racing in the 2017 and 2018 season. On 25 September 2018 Yamaha Motor Europe announced that Paulin is signed to the Wilvo Yamaha Official MXGP Team to race in the 2019 season.

When representing France at The Motocross Des Nations, Paulin is pretty close to perfect. Gautier Paulin is the only French motocross racer to earn Gold Medals in the past 5 straight Motocross Des Nations Championships. Gautier Paulin was crowned Motocross Des Nations Team World Champion in 2014, 2015, 2016, 2017 and 2018.

References

External links
 Gautier Paulin Home page
 Gautier Paulin Team Honda profile

Living people
1990 births
Sportspeople from Var (department)
French motocross riders
BMX riders